is a 2005 Japanese television drama series.

References

External links
 Official website 

2005 Japanese television series debuts
2005 Japanese television series endings
Japanese drama television series
TBS Television (Japan) dramas